Ethmia bradleyi is a moth in the family Depressariidae. It is found in Madagascar.

References

Moths described in 1952
bradleyi
Moths of Madagascar
Moths of Africa